Bryotropha hendrikseni is a moth of the family Gelechiidae. It is found in Italy, Croatia, North Macedonia, Bulgaria, Greece, Crete, Cyprus, Turkey, Ukraine and Turkmenistan.

The wingspan is 12–14 mm. The forewings are fuscous mixed with light ochreous, reddish grey or orange grey. The hindwings are pale ochreous to brown, but darker towards the apex. Adults have been recorded on wing from May to early September.

Etymology
The species is named in honour of Mr. H. Hendriksen who provided technical assistance to the authors.

References

Moths described in 2005
hendrikseni
Moths of Europe
Moths of Asia